Petty France is a street in the City of Westminster in central London, linking Buckingham Gate with Broadway and Queen Anne's Gate.

Among the buildings that line the street is 102 Petty France, which currently houses the Ministry of Justice. The Charity Commission for England and Wales is also headquartered on the street.

History

In A New View of London (1708) Edward Hatton wrote: 'Petit , a considerable street between Tothill Street Westminster E and James Street W ... Stow says here was built 20 houses for poor women to dwell in rent free, by Cornelius Van Dun, a Brabanter, Yeoman of the Guard to King Henry VIII, King Edward VI, Queen Mary and Queen Elizabeth.'

The name is generally thought to refer to the settlement of Huguenot refugees in the area. However, John Stow wrote of Petty France in A Survey of London (1598) and it is uncertain whether Huguenot refugees would have formed a notable community at that time. The London Encyclopaedia (1983, rev 1993) refers to the name deriving from the French wool merchants who used to live there.

The name is also used to refer to the area in the vicinity of the street, the 7th Ward of Westminster. There are similar street names elsewhere in London: e.g. a short street in Billingsgate in the City of London called Petty Wales.

In the second half of the 18th century, "the name was changed to York Street from [Edward], Duke of York, son of George II., who had made a temporary residence amongst them". It retained this name until around 1925, when its previous name was restored.

In 1719, a house was acquired in Petty France to accommodate the Westminster Infirmary. It was the first street in London to be paved for pedestrians, and it was the location of the first custom built artificial ice-rink in London, called Niagara, which opened in the late 1890s. The street was also the home for 50 years until 2002 of the London passport office at Clive House; it is now located at Globe House in Eccleston Square, Victoria.

See also
 
John Cleland (1709–1789), journalist and the author of Fanny Hill, lived and died in a house on Petty France.

Notes

References

Further reading

Streets in the City of Westminster